The 2015–16 VCU Rams women's basketball team will represent Virginia Commonwealth University  during the 2015–16 college basketball season. The Rams, led by second year head coach Beth O'Boyle. The Rams were members of the Atlantic 10 Conference and play their home games at the Stuart C. Siegel Center. They finished the season 23–10, 10–6 in A-10 play to finish in fifth place. They advanced to the semifinals of the A-10 women's tournament where they lost to George Washington. They were invited to the Women's National Invitation Tournament where they lost to Virginia in the first round.

2015–16 media
All non-televised Rams home games and conference road games will stream on the A-10 Digital Network.

Roster

Schedule

|-
!colspan=9 style="background:#000000; color:#F8B800;"| Non-conference regular season

|-
!colspan=9 style="background:#000000; color:#F8B800;"| Atlantic 10 regular season

|-
!colspan=9 style="background:#000000; color:#F8B800;"| Atlantic 10 Women's Tournament

|-
!colspan=9 style="background:#000000; color:#F8B800;"| WNIT

Rankings

See also
 2015–16 VCU Rams men's basketball team

References

VCU Rams women's basketball
VCU
VCU Rams women's basketball seasons
2016 Women's National Invitation Tournament participants